The Women's Long Jump F12 had its Final held on September 14 at 9:20.

Medalists

Results

References
Final

Athletics at the 2008 Summer Paralympics
2008 in women's athletics